Busk is a surname. Notable people with the surname include:

 Douglas Busk (1906 - 1990), British diplomat, mountaineer and geographer
 Edward Teshmaker Busk (1886–1914), aeronautical pioneer
 George Busk RN FRS (1807–1886), British naval surgeon, zoologist and palaeontologist
 Hans Busk, the elder (1772–1862), poet
 Hans Busk, the younger (1815–1882), shootist
 Jens Busk, a politician from Denmark 
 Niels Busk (born 1942), Danish politician
 Rachel Harriette Busk, traveller, collector of tales, writer
 Richard Busk (1895–1961), sportsman (English cricketer)
 Søren Busk (born 10 April 1953), sportsman (Danish football defender)

See also
Busk Medal, awarded by Royal Geographical Society